Sir George-Étienne Cartier Square (officially in ) is a town square in Montreal, Quebec, Canada. It is located in the Saint-Henri neighbourhood of the Southwest borough.

It is a small rectangular square with a fountain in the middle, woods in the northern part and a pool in the southern part. It is surrounded by rowhouses.

Named after politician George-Étienne Cartier, it was built in 1912 on the site of an old west-end slaughterhouse. When Saint-Henri was annexed by the city of Montreal in 1905, the construction of this square had been an election promise made by Hormidas Laporte, the Mayor of Montreal at the time. According to the regulations adopted during its development, the houses around the square were to be built with stone façades and decorative brick.

Restored in 2003, the fountain that occupies the centre of the square was installed for the opening of the square in 1912. The different components of the fountain were ordered by catalogue from J. L. Mott Iron Works foundry of New York City.

References 

Squares in Montreal
George-Étienne Cartier
Le Sud-Ouest